Nordeka LFKA is a Latvian football club located in Riga and playing in Rīgas zona of Latvian 2. līga

Players

First-team squad

Football clubs in Latvia